Belabo is an upazila of the Narsingdi District of Bangladesh, located in the Dhaka Division. Here the 2,500-year-old civilisation of Wari-Bateshwar has been discovered.  It is believed that it was a port city with foreign trade with Ancient Rome, Southeast Asia and other regions. It is the oldest city so far discovered after Indus Valley civilisation. Though part of Narsingdi, the Bengali dialect spoken by the people of Belabo is similar to that of Greater Mymensingh.

Geography
It is bounded by Katiadi Upazila and Kuliarchar Upazila (in Kishoreganj District) to the north, Raipura Upazila to the south, Bhairab Upazila and Kuliarchar Upazila to the east and Shibpur Upazila and Monohardi Upazila to the west.

Etymology
The name of Belabo is said to be derived from bel, which is the Bengali word for the Bengal quince fruit, which can be found in abundance in Belabo.

History

Belabo is the site of the ancient Wari-Bateshwar civilisation in Amlab Union, discovered by the Hanif Pathan and his son, Habibullah Pathan in their village in 1933. The artefacts in this fort city suggest that it dates as far back as 2000 BC. The ancient people of Belabo had bricked houses, walked on wide roads, used silver coins and iron weaponry among many other things. The city also has Asam Rajar Garh (King Asam's Fort). Wari-Bateshwar is thought to be the oldest city in Bengal and the eastern part of the subcontinent.

Belabo later came under the geopolitical division of Samatata before passing on the Khadga dynasty from the 7th century to the 8th century. Following the Conquest of Sylhet in 1303, a 40-year old Iranian nobleman and preacher migrated to Habashpur in present-day Patuli Union. He is known by locals as Shah Irani, and is credited for ending the oppression of local chief Raja Bijaya Mishra and the kingdom of Asam Raja and for introducing Islam in this area. Irani also helped to cure the sick daughter of the chief of Rampur, Ram Narayan. Celebrating the joyous moment, Narayan dug a large reservoir (Maharanir Dighi), embraced Islam and gave his daughter's hand in marriage to Irani though they did not end up having any children. Irani died in the 1350s and was buried in a mazar (mausoleum), where his wife also lies. The mausoleum is an example of Sultanate architecture, and Bengal Sultanate coins have also been discovered in the Wari-Bateshwar ruins.

In the 18th century, Mahbub Ali Bepari of Birbaghab village established the seven-domed Belabo Bazar Central Mosque. The mosque was later renovated and expanded by educationist and Thermax Group chairman Alhaj Abdul Qadir Mullah. The Poradia Muslim High School was founded in 1930.

During the Bangladesh Liberation War of 1971, a battle took place on 14 July in Belabo Sadar leading to the death of 5 Bengali freedom fighters including Commander Abul Bashar. Mass killings took place in Kaliakandi in Sallabad Union with many houses being set on fire.

A grant during the reign of Raja Bhojavarman was discovered in Belabo in the early 20th century. In 1979, the Maharanir Dighi (Maharani's reservoir) was re-excavated and an eight-cubit big turtle was found among other things. The turtle migrated to a canal in the west of the Shah Irani Waqf estate.

In 1982, 6 unions of Monohardi Thana and 2 unions of Raipura Thana (Narayanpur and Sallabad) were taken to form a new upazila, as part of the President of Bangladesh H M Ershad's decentralisation programme. The upazila was named after and headquartered in Belabo, which was previously under Monohardi.

Demographics
As of the 1991 Bangladesh census, Belabo has a population of 145708. Males constitute 51.05% of the population, and females 48.95%. This Upazila's eighteen up population is 73046. It has 27802 households.

Administration
Belabo Upazila is divided into eight union parishads: Amlaba, Bajnaba, Belabo, Binnabayd, Char Uzilab, Naraynpur, Patuli, and Sallabad. The union parishads are subdivided into 51 mauzas and 100 villages. 

Elected Member of Parliament – Adv. Nurul Majid Mahmud Humayun (Elected – 1986 and also the Present MP elected in the 9th parliamentary election 2008 )Sarder Sakhawat Hossain Bakul (1991 and 2001) and L. G. Nuruddin khan (1996)Adv.Mohammad Shahidullah Bhuyain (1954 M.N.A,1962 M.N.A,1979 M.P,1988 M.P)First Up-Zilla chairman-Abu Tarek Al Hussain Bhuyain.

Upazila Chairmen

Education
Belabo has an average literacy rate of 29.9% (7+ years), and the national average of 32.4% literate.

Economy and tourism

Belabo is home to numerous tourist attractions and archeological sites such as the ancient Wari-Bateshwar ruins and the medieval Maharanir Dighi lake, which is the largest reservoir in eastern Dhaka Division. The mosque of Belabo Bazar and Sultanate-era mausoleum of Shah Irani are also notable as well as the Matialpara and Baribari war memorials.

Notable people

Abdul Hamid, educationist
Abdul Jalil, sergeant associated with the Agartala Conspiracy Case
Hanif Pathan, folklorist and antiquarian
Muhammad Habibullah Pathan, researcher and archaeologist
Rashiduddin Ahmad, neurosurgeon and sportsperson buried in Belabo

See also
Upazilas of Bangladesh
Districts of Bangladesh
Divisions of Bangladesh

References

Upazilas of Narsingdi District